The 1911–12 Maltese First Division was the second edition Maltese First Division. It was contested between five teams, each playing a match against the other teams; Floriana were able to defend their title won in the first edition.

League table

Results

See also 
 1911 in association football
 1912 in association football

1911-12
1911–12 in European association football leagues
1911 in Malta
1912 in Malta